Duan Jingli (born 8 March 1989) is a Chinese competitive rower.

Duan was born in 1989. Initially a volley ball player, she did not grow tall enough to make China's national team and on advice by her parents, she took up rowing in 2003 instead.

Duan competes in the single sculls. She first competed at World Championship level in 2010 on Lake Karapiro in New Zealand, where she came  in eights place. She won a bronze medal at the 2014 World Rowing Championships at Bosbaan, Amsterdam in the Netherlands. At the 2015 World Rowing Championships at Lac d'Aiguebelette, Aiguebelette in France, she achieved the same result.

She competed at the 2016 Summer Olympics in Rio de Janeiro, in the women's single sculls, and again won bronze. She was portrayed as FISA's Athlete of the Month in October 2017.

Duan got engaged during 2017.

References

1989 births
Living people
Chinese female rowers
Olympic rowers of China
Rowers at the 2016 Summer Olympics
Olympic medalists in rowing
2016 Olympic bronze medalists for China
Asian Games medalists in rowing
Rowers at the 2014 Asian Games
Asian Games gold medalists for China
Medalists at the 2014 Asian Games
World Rowing Championships medalists for China
People from Yanshi
Sportspeople from Luoyang
20th-century Chinese women
21st-century Chinese women